Podturn is a small settlement in the Municipality of Rogaška Slatina in eastern Slovenia. The area belongs to the traditional Styria region and is now included in the Savinja Statistical Region.

References

External links
Podturn on Geopedia

Populated places in the Municipality of Rogaška Slatina